Lanier Heights is a small urban neighborhood located in the northwest section of Washington, D.C. It was one of the early planned subdivisions which were created inside the District of Columbia, but which lay outside of the original, officially-planned City of Washington. Situated two miles north of the White House, Lanier Heights is within the larger and newer neighborhood of Adams Morgan, and is usually considered to be a part of that more prominent locale.   

The area of Lanier Heights, just about 50 acres (20.25 hectares) in size, is bounded by 16th Street on the east, Adams Mill Road and the National Zoo on the west; Columbia Road to the south, and Harvard Street on the north.  Developed mostly between 1900 and 1940, Lanier Heights consists primarily of row houses, plus a number of low- and medium-rise apartment buildings.  The architecture is generally typical of the early twentieth century, in a variety of styles, especially Classical Revival. Some of the apartment houses have distinctive, well-crafted Art Deco designs. The area also contains a commercial stretch of stores on its southern side along Columbia Road. Just to the north of Lanier Heights, is the slightly older neighborhood of Mount Pleasant.

Lanier Heights is a part of the city's Ward One. And within D.C.'s Advisory Neighborhood Commission system, the area is a part of ANC 1-C.

History 
Most of the land beneath Lanier Heights was part of a large, undeveloped piece of property granted in 1714 to John Bradford, who had then named the tract "Plain Dealing". In 1763, this "Plain Dealing" tract was purchased by Robert Peter of Georgetown. Another small portion of the neighborhood's land came from part of a large piece of property acquired by James Holmead in 1733. Little activity occurred on the land here until after 1800. One early structure in the area was a tavern that James Eslin built in 1826, on property that he had obtained for use as a small farm. The tavern, which quickly became a popular local gambling house, sat near the present-day intersection of 16th Street and Columbia Road. (The Eslin tract would eventually be developed in the 1920s, forming the eastern part of the neighborhood.)  But in general, the land that became Lanier Heights was being only lightly used—mostly (if at all) for common farming—until shortly after the end of the Civil War, when Washington started to grow with more vigor. For a time after that war, there was a small quarry, for construction stone and gravel, located along Rock Creek at the northern edge of the area.

The formal development of the neighborhood began in 1883 with the creation of the “Lanier Heights Subdivision", a project planned and financed by Elizabeth Lanier Dunn and her husband General William M. Dunn.  This plan’s somewhat casual street configuration was laid out just a few years before Congress decreed in 1888 that henceforth the rectangular grid system of the central city would be continued throughout the District for all new street construction. 

At first the new subdivision's growth was slow.  Within several years banker Archibald M. McLachlen and biologist George Brown Goode of the Smithsonian Institution had, in large part, gained control of the tract with the idea of having the neighborhood become a residential community for Smithsonian employees and other professionals in Washington. In 1897, the opening of an electric streetcar line on Columbia Road encouraged activity. Additionally, the 1902-06 construction of The Ontario, a noteworthy and attractive apartment house, brought further attention, and people, to the area. The subdivision then developed into a fairly affluent area of families and single people, including professionals, intellectuals, and city workers. Several of the city's first housing cooperatives sprang up in Lanier Heights, including the Stafford and the Lambert (at 1789 and 1791 Lanier Place), developed by William H. Sholes, and 1705 Lanier Place, the first apartment building constructed explicitly as a cooperative. 

In the segregated past, it was a white neighborhood, but by the 1960s and 1970s it had become a diverse mix of people and cultures, and, for a time, a local hub of anti-establishment politics where the Black Panthers, anti-Vietnam War organizers and other activists groups resided. Recent rising home prices, however, have made it somewhat more difficult for a number of the less well-to-do residents to remain in the area.

References 

Neighborhoods in Northwest (Washington, D.C.)
Adams Morgan